Saugut is an Austrian television series.

See also
List of Austrian television series

Austrian children's television series
Austrian television shows featuring puppetry
2000s Austrian television series
2010s Austrian television series
2008 Austrian television series debuts
German-language television shows
ORF (broadcaster)